In enzymology, a Delta12-fatty acid dehydrogenase is an enzyme that catalyzes the chemical reaction

linoleate + 2AH + O2  crepenynate + 2A + H2O

where AH is either NADH or NADPH.

The 3 substrates of this enzyme are linoleate, 2AH, and O2, whereas its 3 products are crepenynate, 2A, and H2O.

This enzyme belongs to the family of oxidoreductases, specifically those acting on paired donors, with O2 as oxidant and incorporation or reduction of oxygen. The oxygen incorporated need not be derive from O miscellaneous.

This enzyme participates in linoleic acid metabolism.

Nomenclature 

The systematic name of this enzyme class is linoleate, hydrogen-donor:oxygen oxidoreductase (Delta12-unsaturating). Other names in common use include
 crepenynate synthase and 
 linoleate Delta12-fatty acid acetylenase (desaturase).

References

Further reading 

 
 

EC 1.14.99
Enzymes of unknown structure